The 1972 Rothmans Canadian Open was a tennis tournament played on outdoor clay courts at the Toronto Cricket Skating and Curling Club in Toronto in Canada that was part of the 1972 Commercial Union Assurance Grand Prix The men's tournament was categorized as a Grade A tournament, the second-highest category, while the women's competition was a Grade D event. The tournament was held from August 14 through August 20, 1972. Ilie Năstase and Evonne Goolagong won the singles titles.

Finals

Men's singles
 Ilie Năstase defeated  Andrew Pattison 6–4, 6–3
 It was Năstase's 12th title of the year and the 28th of his career.

Women's singles
 Evonne Goolagong defeated  Virginia Wade 6–3, 6–1
 It was Goolagong's 8th title of the year and the 27th of her career.

Men's doubles
 Ilie Năstase /  Ion Ţiriac defeated  Jan Kodeš /  Jan Kukal 7–6, 6–3
 It was Năstase's 13th title of the year and the 29th of his career. It was Ţiriac's 4th title of the year and the 10th of his career.

Women's doubles
 Margaret Court /  Evonne Goolagong defeated  Brenda Kirk /  Pat Walkden 3–6, 6–3, 7–5
 It was Court's 4th title of the year and the 94th of her career. It was Goolagong's 9th title of the year and the 28th of her career.

References

External links
 
 Association of Tennis Professionals (ATP) tournament profile
 Women's Tennis Association (WTA) tournament profile

Rothmans Canadian Open
Rothmans Canadian Open
Rothmans Canadian Open
Rothmans Canadian Open
Canadian Open (tennis)